The BOSS GP Series is a motor racing series in Europe. The category originated in 1995 as the BOSS Formula series and evolved into the EuroBOSS Series.

BOSS is an acronym that stands for Big Open Single Seaters.

History 

The BOSS series was founded in 1995 under the regulations of the RAC Motor Sports Association and raced mainly in Great Britain. The series grew in popularity and later expanded to Europe, being renamed to European BOSS (shortened by the competitors to EuroBOSS) following the European expansion and the involvement of Paul Stoddart's European Aviation. The move to Europe resulted in increased investment into the series and an increased number of Formula 1 cars taking part in races. It mainly saw grids of around 12–15 cars, but on some occasions as few as five cars competed in a race.

After the 2009 EuroBOSS season Marijn van Kalmthout, Klaas Zwart (founder of Ascari Cars and the Ascari Race Resort), Henk de Boer and  decided to split off and organize their own race series. This ended up becoming BOSS GP. EuroBOSS continued on into 2010. BOSS GP flourished, with many drivers making the switch to the new series, whilst EuroBOSS saw smaller and smaller numbers. Eventually, the final 3 races of the 2010 EuroBOSS season were cancelled and the series was disbanded, with competitors switching over to BOSS GP.

Most BOSS GP entries are more recent secondary level single-seaters such as GP2 cars and Renault World Series cars along with a small number of 90s and 00s Formula 1 cars, but common EuroBOSS entries included Formula One machines from Benetton, Jordan, Tyrrell, Minardi and on occasions a V12 Ferrari. Other frequent entrants in BOSS series have been Lola and Reynard CART chassis, the 1997-2002 Panoz (aka G-Force) and Dallara IndyCar chassis. From 2012, the 2003-2011 Dallara and Panoz Champ Car chassis have also been used after the switch to the new IndyCar formula.

The series is mainly populated by wealthy drivers, although efforts have been made to attract more young drivers who want experience with Formula 1 or Formula 2-level machinery. BOSS GP removes a lot of the restrictions present in the majority of Formula series, allowing weight and power restrictions to be abandoned as long as they comply to the FIA safety requirements. The series uses Pirelli tyres that have a larger operating window than those in F1 and F2; this is mainly designed to help the drivers, but they still behave similarly enough to the P-Zeros used in F2 to provide a valid reference for the younger drivers. BOSS GP also has fairly loose restrictions on testing, something which many junior drivers have exploited to gain experience with new circuits, new cars and learning how to handle cars with high levels of downforce.

As of 2013 two rounds of the BOSS GP series have formed an official German championship sanctioned by the DMSB. In the 2018 season, BOSS GP ran a support race for two major motorsports events (the German Grand Prix at Hockenheim and the Red Bull Ring round of the DTM Championship) for the first time. The series later supported DTM at Assen in 2019 and Spa-Francorchamps in 2020. It also expressed an interest in taking part in the planned 70 years of F1 celebrations at Silverstone before those plans were cancelled entirely due to COVID-19 restrictions.

In 2020 the championship ran with a reduced season; the planned Misano and Hockenheim rounds were forced to be cancelled due to COVID-19 restrictions, reducing the 2020 season to four weekends.

Notable drivers who have raced in BOSS, EuroBOSS and BOSS GP include Scott Mansell (who won the EuroBOSS championship in 2004), IndyCar driver Rinus VeeKay, former Minardi driver Tarso Marques and former Formula 2 driver Mahaveer Raghunathan. Romain Grosjean also did some test sessions with BOSS GP regulars Top Speed before his return to F1 with Lotus in 2012.

Similar series
EuroBOSS was the European equivalent of USBOSS and OZBOSS. EuroBOSS tended to mainly have F1 Cars, whilst USBOSS consisted mainly of Indy and Champ Cars and OZBOSS tended to have Formula 4000 or equivalent.

Cars

Over the years the classes have been updated. Relatively new cars like the Dallara GP2/08 (GP2), Dallara T08 (WSbR) and Lola B05/52 (A1GP/Auto GP/FA1) have recently been raced in the series, as well as some Formula 1 cars from the 00s such as the Toro Rosso STR1, Super Aguri SA06, Jaguar R3 and Jaguar R5. For 2010, EuroBOSS allowed the Tatuus N.T07 International Formula Master car to race in the series; this car was never allowed in the BOSS GP series.

Actual classes and cars in the BOSS GP Racing Series (since season 2022):

Circuits

  Algarve International Circuit (2009)
  Anderstorp Raceway (2009)
  Ascari Race Resort (2006–2008)
  Autodrom Most (2002)
  Automotodróm Slovakia Ring (2010)
  Brands Hatch (1996, 1998–2004, 2006, 2009)
  Brno Circuit (2014–present)
  Bugatti Circuit (2002–2004)
  Castle Combe Circuit (1997)
  Circuit de Barcelona-Catalunya (2007)
  Circuit de Nevers Magny-Cours (2005, 2010)
  Circuit de Spa-Francorchamps (2003, 2008–2011, 2020)
  Circuit Paul Ricard (2013–2015, 2017, 2022)
  Circuit Zolder (2000, 2003–2010, 2013, 2015, 2017)
  Circuit Zandvoort (2002, 2006, 2009–2014, 2017)
  Circuito del Jarama (2008)
  Donington Park (1995–2004, 2007–2008, 2011)
  Dijon-Prenois (2009–2010, 2012, 2015)
  Hockenheimring (2007–2008, 2010–2019, 2022)
  Imola Circuit (2012, 2014, 2016–2017, 2019–2020)
  Lausitzring (2004–2005, 2009)
  Mallory Park (1996–1997)
  Misano World Circuit Marco Simoncelli (2021–present)
  Mondello Park (1996–1999, 2001–2002, 2006)
  Monza Circuit (2011–2016, 2018–2019, 2021)
  Motorsport Arena Oschersleben (2006)
  Mugello Circuit (2014, 2020–present)
  Nürburgring (2007–2008, 2010, 2012)
  Oulton Park (1995–1998)
  Red Bull Ring (2011–2014, 2016, 2018–2019, 2021–present)
  Rockingham Motor Speedway (2001)
  Silverstone Circuit (1995–1999, 2001, 2003–2004)
  Snetterton Circuit (1997, 2007)
  Thruxton Circuit (1996, 1998–2000)
  TT Circuit Assen (2010, 2015–2019,2023)

Champions

BOSS Formula & EuroBOSS

BOSS GP Series

References

External links
 

Formula racing series
European auto racing series
Recurring events established in 2001